Kevin S. Jones (born August 21, 1982) is a former American college and professional football player. Jones was a consensus All-American running back for Virginia Tech in 2003 and selected in the first round of the 2004 NFL Draft. Jones played professionally for six seasons (2004–10) for the Detroit Lions and Chicago Bears in the National Football League (NFL).

Early years

High school 
Jones was born in Chester, Pennsylvania. With his natural ability and his father's training regimen, he became a highly conditioned athlete at a very young age. Jones was a multi-sport athlete in high school (1997-2001) and competed at the varsity level as a freshman at Cardinal O'Hara High School in Springfield Township, Delaware County, Pennsylvania.

Track and field
Jones was a star track and field athlete, excelling in the 60 meters (6.79 sec), 100 meters (10.59 sec), long jump (6.92 m) and triple jump (14.57 m).

Football 
O'Hara Head football coach, George Stratts reluctantly started Jones as a freshman. Jones had immediate success on the field and was a four-year starter, breaking many school records. As a senior, he led his team to a Philadelphia Catholic League Championship and became the Catholic League's all-time leading rusher.

Jones is the inaugural winner of the U.S. Army Player of the Year Award, named the "Hall Trophy", which is presented to the best high school football player in the country. Other notable recipients of the award include: Adrian Peterson, Jimmy Clausen, and Terrelle Pryor.

College choice reveal 
In 2000, Jones was the No.1 overall recruit in the nation. Courted by many colleges, Kevin narrowed his choices to Penn State and Virginia Tech. To the surprise of many, Jones chose to become a Hokie, making his decision the day after a home visit from Virginia Tech Head Coach, Frank Beamer.

Jones said of his decision, "If you're a blue-chipper from Pennsylvania, you go to Penn State. But I've always been a little contrary. On the day of my press conference, I still hadn't decided between Virginia Tech and PSU. As I sat down in front of everybody, I had both jerseys with me. I pulled the Penn State jersey out of a bag and said, "I will ... not be attending Penn State." Then I ripped off my sweater and had a Mike Vick jersey on underneath. The entire room was flabbergasted."

Jones' college reveal was so highly anticipated that it was covered nationally, and televised by several local news stations. Since then, the use of props (hats, shirts, gear, music etc.) by recruits to announce their college choice has become a staple of the recruiting experience. The phenomenon can be credited to Jones, who was the first to ever do so with his reveal in 2000.

College career
Jones played for Virginia Tech and Hall of Fame coach Frank Beamer, from 2000 to 2003.  He is the highest rated recruit to ever commit to the Virginia Tech football program.  During his freshman season, Jones assumed the starting job, after an injury to starter, Lee Suggs. Jones set a school record for rushing yards for a freshman. In 2002, Suggs and Jones split time at tailback, and were together called "The Untouchables" as a result of a fan contest for giving the duo a nickname.

Kevin finished his college career with 3,475 yards and 35 touchdowns on 616 carries (an average of 5.6 yards per carry), and 24 receptions for 229 yards (an average of 9.5 yards per reception).  His 3,475 rushing yards and 35 touchdowns both rank second on the school's career-record list. He was elected to the Virginia Tech Sports Hall of Fame in 2016.

Stats
2001: 175 carries for 957 yards (5.47) and 5 TD. 6 catches for 47 yards.
2002: 160 carries for 871 yards (5.44) and 9 TD. 4 catches for 21 yards.
2003: 281 carries for 1647 yards (5.86) and 21 TD. 14 catches for 161 yards.

Professional career

Detroit Lions
Jones had a successful rookie season with the Detroit Lions and became only the third running back in franchise history to rush for over 1,000 yards in his rookie season, joining the ranks of Billy Sims and Hall of Famer Barry Sanders. He was sidelined at the end of the 2006 season with a foot injury.

In 2007, Jones began the season in a backup role. He became the starter in Week 7 against the Tampa Bay Buccaneers. He rushed for 105 yards on 23 carries and one touchdown in a Week 8 victory over the division rival Chicago Bears.  However, he suffered another season-ending injury. On March 13, 2008, the Lions released Jones.

Chicago Bears
On July 15, 2008, Jones signed a one-year, $605,000 contract with the Chicago Bears.

He was re-signed to a two-year contract worth approximately $3.5 million on March 6, 2009. The deal includes a $1 million bonus and $2 million in the first season. He was intended to be the primary backup to Matt Forte. On September 3, 2009, Jones was injured during a preseason game when he was hit out of bounds by Cleveland Browns linebacker Marcus Benard. He was out for the 2009 season with torn ligaments in his left ankle.

Jones was released on March 9, 2010, after the Bears signed Chester Taylor during the free agency period.

Hartford Colonials
On September 27, 2010, Jones signed with the Hartford Colonials of the UFL. In his only season with the Colonials, Jones played in two games where he rushed for 41 yards on 16 carries before being placed on injured reserve on October 21, 2010.

Personal
Jones retired from football in 2011 and returned to Virginia Tech as a student later that year to study industrial design in the College of Architecture and Urban Studies. He graduated with a bachelor's degree in industrial design in 2014.

While interning at a furniture design company in Switzerland, Jones manned the position of "grinder" as the only American in a 22-man crew aboard the 68 ft. racing yacht,  Caol ila R. By the summer of 2014, Jones had worked five races with the team.

In 2014, Virginia Tech hired Jones as "Special Assistant to the Athletic Director". Jones stepped down from the position on June 12, 2016.

In 2015, Jones co-founded the  design firm Void Design Haus in Blacksburg, Virginia, with Alex Barrette. They changed the company name to JoBa in 2016, as a combination of their last names.

On June 3, 2019, the Tampa Bay Buccaneers introduced Jones as a Bill Walsh Coaching Fellow, in a running backs coaching position role for the 2019 Mini-Camp.

References

External links
Virginia Tech Hokies bio
Racing Yacht 68' IRC-Racer-Caol-ila-R
Void Design Haus

1982 births
Living people
African-American players of American football
All-American college football players
American football running backs
American male sailors (sport)
Chicago Bears players
Detroit Lions players
Hartford Colonials players
Players of American football from Pennsylvania
Sportspeople from Chester, Pennsylvania
Virginia Tech Hokies football players
21st-century African-American sportspeople
20th-century African-American people
Ed Block Courage Award recipients